Interstate 105 (I-105) is an east–west auxiliary Interstate Highway in the Greater Los Angeles urban area of Southern California. It runs from State Route 1 (SR 1) near El Segundo and Los Angeles International Airport (LAX) to I-605 in the City of Norwalk. It is commonly known as the Century Freeway after Century Boulevard which it parallels, and also officially known as the Glenn Anderson Freeway after the late congressman Glenn M. Anderson who advocated for its construction.

Route description

The California Streets and Highways Code defines Route 105 as "from Pershing Drive near El Segundo to Route 605", but Caltrans never constructed the segment from Sepulveda Boulevard to Pershing Drive. Motorists can continue west via Imperial Highway over conventional roadway to Pershing Drive, but it is not part of Route 105 nor is it under state maintenance.
I-105 begins at Sepulveda Boulevard (SR 1) on the southern edge of Los Angeles International Airport (LAX), adjacent to the city of El Segundo. It proceeds generally eastward from there on, crossing the Los Angeles and San Gabriel Rivers before terminating just east of the San Gabriel River Freeway (I-605) in western Norwalk.

The freeway stops short of intersecting with the Santa Ana Freeway (I-5), its parent interstate. Instead, the primary lanes of I-105 terminate at an at-grade intersection with Studebaker Road.

Much of the length of the Century Freeway runs parallel to Imperial Highway. Century Boulevard, in turn, is named for its position equivalent to 100th Street in the Los Angeles grid. 

The Los Angeles Metro Rail C Line runs in the median of nearly the entire length of I-105. The C Line's eastern terminus is at Norwalk, at the interchange between I-105 and I-605;  from the western end of the freeway, the C Line separates onto its own right-of-way at Aviation Boulevard, splitting into two branches: one turning south towards Redondo Beach and one (currently in the testing stages) heading north towards near LAX and future people mover, which is scheduled to open in 2023.

I-105 is part of the California Freeway and Expressway System, and is part of the National Highway System, a network of highways that are considered essential to the country's economy, defense, and mobility by the Federal Highway Administration.

History

Early planning
I-105 was an integral part of a Caltrans 1960s master plan for the Southern California freeway system, but did not open until 1993. The right-of-way was included on several early highway plans since at least 1947, although it was not named the "Century Freeway" until 1956, and was numbered Route 42. In 1965, the Century Freeway was added to the state system originated at State Route 1 (Sepulveda Boulevard) east to Central Avenue in the City of Los Angeles along an alignment very near to the current right-of-way. The current route was added to the Interstate system in 1968.

Design and local opposition
The route was designed between 1968 and 1972 by Caltrans District 7, under the direction of Design Chief Sid Elicks. However, opposition from some of the communities through which the right-of-way would pass slowed the process and led to some reroutings. Many factors contributed to the delay. The growth of the environmental movement in the 1960s created resistance to new freeway construction. Fiscal difficulties brought about by the 1971 Sylmar earthquake and the California tax revolt of the late 1970s further hampered Caltrans' construction efforts.

However, the major source of resistance to the freeway's construction was community opposition and the side effects of these demands. By the early 1970s, most of the areas in the freeway's path (and thus slated to be demolished) were predominantly African-American. Resentment over previous freeway projects' effects on other black communities resulted in significant modifications to the original route. Most cities along the way, weary of the noise and visual blight created by elevated freeways, demanded that the route be built far below grade in a "trench". Also, another source for resistance to the freeway's construction was that much of the I-105 path was going to be built in low income, high crime neighborhoods, which also delayed the freeway's construction until the crime in the areas went down.

Norwalk was opposed to the freeway's proposed route through its city center, and blocked the freeway from reaching its intended terminus at the Santa Ana Freeway; however, Caltrans had already decided to abandon that section due to the inability of the severely congested Santa Ana Freeway to accommodate any more traffic.

Keith v. Volpe
In 1972, community opposition resulted in a federal lawsuit, Keith v. Volpe, being filed, charging a violation of various civil rights protections and the National Environmental Policy Act (NEPA). An important figure in the freeway's history was Harry Pregerson, a United States federal judge who presided over the lawsuit concerning the freeway's construction and chose to continue presiding over the case despite being promoted to a higher level court. The interchange with I-110 is named the Judge Harry Pregerson Interchange in his honor. In 1972, Judge Pregerson enjoined the further development of the freeway until it has complied with the requirements of NEPA, the California Environmental Quality Act (CEQA), the Federal-Aid Highway Act, and the Uniform Relocation Assistance and Real Property Acquisition Act of 1970.

In 1979, this lawsuit resulted in a Consent Decree, amended in 1981, which imposed several conditions on development of the freeway, including additional public hearings, preparation of an environmental report, alterations to the design to reduce lanes and intersections, improve carpooling and provide for a transit way, which became the Los Angeles Metro Rail Green Line, now known as the C Line. A portion of the right-of-way was also to be constructed below grade to buffer adjacent areas from the effects of traffic noise. At one point, a large sinkhole opened in the Bellflower Boulevard on-ramp. This resulted in the construction of an elaborate pump system along the freeway between the interchanges with I-710 and I-605.

Century Freeway Housing Program
A significant aspect of the Keith v. Volpe Consent Decree was the requirement that the housing removed to construct the freeway be replaced, leading to the creation of the Century Freeway Housing Program within the California Department of Housing and Community Development.

Notable demolished homes and buildings

The childhood home of Brian, Carl and Dennis Wilson of The Beach Boys was demolished in the mid-1980s to make way for the freeway, as was the house across the street where their bandmate David Marks grew up. In 2005, the Beach Boys Historic Landmark was built on the former site of the Wilson brothers' home and declared a California Historic Landmark. 

The birthplace of Metallica, former bassist Ron McGovney's house, stood directly in the path of the route nearby to I-605 in Downey. 

Another home in Downey, California, where siblings Richard and Karen Carpenter grew up before forming the musical duo The Carpenters, was also razed for I-105.

Post-construction

Throughout the difficulties, Congressman Glenn M. Anderson (D-San Pedro) tirelessly advocated for the route's construction, making claims it would provide congestion relief along Century, Manchester, and Firestone Boulevards and the Imperial Highway, as well as relieving pressure on the Santa Monica (I-10) and San Diego (I-405) Freeways for travelers between Downtown Los Angeles and LAX. After Anderson's death in 1994, Caltrans honored him by renaming the freeway in his honor. However, the route's original name, "Century Freeway", is still used on a number of maps.

The freeway was originally signed with El Segundo as its westbound control city; however, in recent years, many of the El Segundo signs have been replaced and/or covered with "LAX Airport" signage due to the western terminus' proximity to Los Angeles International Airport.

Shortly before opening, filmmakers had access to use the empty freeway for a number of weeks to film the 1994 motion picture Speed.

Interstate 105 (1964–68)
Previously, the I-105 designation was used for U.S. Route 101 (the Santa Ana Freeway, US 101) from I-5 (the Golden State Freeway) at the East Los Angeles Interchange to the connection to I-10 (the San Bernardino Freeway; this connection had been I-110); it went back to US 101 in 1968.

Exit list

See also

References

External links

 California @ AARoads.com - Interstate 105
 California Highways: I-105
Caltrans: Route 105 highway conditions
 Interstate 105 @ Asphaltplanet.ca

05-1
1 (California)
105
05-1 California
Interstate 05-1
Inglewood, California
Hawthorne, California